Liu Jiahui (born  in Handan) is a Chinese individual rhythmic gymnast.

Career 
Liu has competed for China at World Championships, including at the 2014 World Rhythmic Gymnastics Championships where the Chinese team finished 13th. She also participated at the 2014 Asian Games, finishing 10th in the individual all-round. She also competed at the 2015  World Rhythmic Gymnastics Championships.

In June 2017, Liu competed at the 2017 Asian Championships and finished 6th in the all-round. She won a bronze medal in the ball final behind Kaho Minagawa of Japan.

She began the sport in primary school in Handan, China.

References

External links
 FIG profile

1996 births
Living people
Gymnasts at the 2014 Asian Games
Chinese rhythmic gymnasts
Sportspeople from Handan
Gymnasts from Hebei
Asian Games competitors for China
21st-century Chinese women